Beech Hill is an unincorporated community in Mason County, West Virginia, United States.

The community derives its name from the beech trees near the elevated town site.

References 

Unincorporated communities in West Virginia
Unincorporated communities in Mason County, West Virginia